Chennaraopet is a village and a mandal in Warangal district in the state of Telangana in India.

Villages 

 Akkalchedu 
 Ameenabad 
 Chennaraopet 
 Gurijala 
 Jhalli 
 Konapuram 
 Lingagiri 
 Lingapuram 
 Papaiahpeta 
 Suripalle 
 Thimmarainipahad 
 Upparapally 
 Yellaigudem

References 
 villageinfo.in

Villages in Warangal district
Mandals in Warangal district